On 29 January 2010, the IUCN Red List of Threatened Species identified 1 data deficient species in the Annelida phylum (Animalia kingdom).

Polychaeta

Eunicida

Eunicidae

References
 IUCN 2009. IUCN Red List of Threatened Species, v2009.2. Source of the above list: online IUCN Red List. Retrieved d.d. 29 January 2010.

Annelida